Kanthararom railway station is a railway station located in Dun Subdistrict, Kanthararom District, Sisaket Province.

References 

Railway stations in Thailand
Sisaket province